Ramiro Alexis Ríos (born 7 November 1995) is an Argentine professional footballer who plays as a centre-back for Vélez Sarsfield.

Career
Ríos came through the Vélez Sarsfield youth system. He was twice an unused substitute in Primera División action in the 2015 season, though never made it on to the field of play. In January 2017, Ríos completed a twelve-month loan move to Peruvian Primera División side Universidad San Martín. His first appearance arrived on 4 February versus Alianza Atlético, which preceded the centre-back receiving a red card in his third senior match against Sporting Cristal on 19 February. Whilst in Peru, as he featured twenty-nine times, Ríos scored goals in fixtures with Melgar and Comerciantes Unidos.

Ríos returned to Vélez Sarsfield in January 2018, but was loaned out against six months later to UAI Urquiza in Primera B Metropolitana. He scored on debut for the club, netting in a one-nil win over Defensores Unidos on 19 August. Twelve further league games followed for him in the third tier, as they secured a ninth place finish.

Career statistics
.

References

External links

1995 births
Living people
Sportspeople from Buenos Aires Province
Argentine footballers
Association football defenders
Argentine expatriate footballers
Expatriate footballers in Peru
Argentine expatriate sportspeople in Peru
Peruvian Primera División players
Club Atlético Vélez Sarsfield footballers
Club Deportivo Universidad de San Martín de Porres players
UAI Urquiza players